Carey Wayne Bender (born January 28, 1972 in Marion, Iowa) is a former professional American football running back in the National Football League. He attended Coe College, where he still holds numerous rushing records. He was given an opportunity to play in the NFL by Buffalo Bills head coach Marv Levy, a fellow Coe College graduate. He played with the Buffalo Bills in 1996 as a member of the team's practice squad. After playing well in the NFL pre-season, he appeared in one game of the regular season, but recorded no carries.

External links
Pro-Football reference

1972 births
Living people
Sportspeople from Cedar Rapids, Iowa
Buffalo Bills players
People from Marion, Iowa
Coe Kohawks football players